Katharina Wildermut (born 17 April 1979) is a German rhythmic gymnast. She competed in the women's group all-around event at the 1996 Summer Olympics.

References

External links
 

1979 births
Living people
German rhythmic gymnasts
Olympic gymnasts of Germany
Gymnasts at the 1996 Summer Olympics
Sportspeople from Halle (Saale)